Chinaksen (lit.  "near the hole") is a town located in Chinaksen woreda, East Hararghe Zone of the eastern Oromia Region, Ethiopia. Chinaksan is a historical settlement with stone walls built at the foot of an oval hill; on the hill are ruins of fortifications of Adalite origins during the Adal Sultanate period.
 
The writer Nega Mezlekia, an Amhara from Jijiga who had joined the Western Somali Liberation Movement, relates how he participated in an attack on a Derg military training camp in Chinaksen. No prisoners were taken in the attack; those who surrendered were shot dead. Early in the Ogaden War, Chinaksen was captured by Somali units as they advanced on Dire Dawa; it was recaptured by Ethiopian units between 5 and 9 February 1978.

In late January 2009, the Ethiopian Electric Power Corporation completed a  electric power line from Jijiga to Chinhahsan, while constructing six power distributors in the town. This provided 24-hour electric service to Chinaksen for the first time.

Demographics 
Based on figures from the Central Statistical Agency in 2005, Chinaksen had an estimated total population of 11,558 of whom 5,981 are men and 5,577 are women. According to the 1994 national census this city had a population of 56,821 people. This town is one of the two largest settlements in Jijiga woreda.

The 1997 census reported this town had a total population of 7,753 of whom 3,951 were men and 3,802 women. The three largest ethnic groups reported in this town were the Oromo (64.72%), Somali (20.59%), and the Amhara (10.8%); all other ethnic groups made up

References 

Cities and towns in Oromia Region